Angarsk Electrochemical Combine is a company based in Angarsk, Russia. It is a subsidiary of TVEL (Rosatom group). 

The Angarsk Electrochemical Combine manufactures uranium hexafluoride, triflic acid, niobium oxide, tantalum oxide, radiation detectors, automated personnel monitoring systems for use in nuclear power plants, and a variety of chemicals.

References

External links
 Official website

Chemical companies of Russia
Companies based in Irkutsk Oblast
Rosatom
Russian brands
Manufacturing companies of the Soviet Union